The Bolshaya Chukochya or Chukochya (Revum-Revu) is a river in the Sakha Republic (Yakutia) of the Russian Federation.

Course
It has its sources in Lake Usun-Kyuel and crosses the tundra roughly northeastwards. In its lower course it flows south of Lake Bolshoye Morskoye. Finally it flows into the Kolyma Gulf of the East Siberian Sea west of the mouths of the Kolyma. Owing to its extreme northerly location the Bolshaya Chukochya freezes up in early October and remains icebound until June.

The Bolshaya Chukochya basin is located between the basins of the Alazeya and the Kolyma.
There are study sites near the Bolshaya Chukochya in order to investigate the mineral transformations in the soils affected by permafrost.

Tributaries  

Ecology
The Kolyma Lowland, the area where the Bolshaya Chukochya flows, has many lakes and marshes. A great variety of birds, like Siberian cranes, waders and sandpipers, make their habitat in this riverine area.

Fossil insects, early Pleistocene equids and mammoths have been found in the basin of the Bolshaya Chukochya.

See also
List of rivers of Russia

References

Further reading

Rivers of the Sakha Republic
Drainage basins of the East Siberian Sea
East Siberian Lowland